The Men’s Singles tournament of the 1994 Tokyo Indoor tennis championship took place in Tokyo, Japan, between 10 October and 16 October 1994. 64 players from 16 countries competed in the 6-round tournament. The final winner was Goran Ivanišević of Croatia, who defeated Michael Chang of the US. The defending champion from 1993, Ivan Lendl, did not compete.

Seeds

Draw

Finals

Top half

Section 1

Section 2

Bottom half

Section 3

Section 4

References

 Main Draw

1994 ATP Tour
Tokyo Indoor